The Lady Objects is a 1938 American drama film written by Gladys Lehman and Charles Kenyon and directed by Erle C. Kenton. It was nominated for the Oscar for Best Song at the 11th Academy Awards with the song A Mist Over the Moon, with music by Ben Oakland and lyric by Oscar Hammerstein II. Although the writing credits differ, this film bears a striking resemblance to Columbia's 1933 film, Ann Carver's Profession.

Plot

Bill Hayward's years as a college athlete and singer are behind him, and while he struggles financially, his attorney wife Ann is prospering, promoted to junior partner in her law firm.

While she's in Washington, D.C., on business, Bill accompanies friends June and George to a New York City nightclub where they have been hired to entertain. He is persuaded to get on stage and sing himself, but resists the temptation to get into a romantic situation with June, a former girlfriend from their school days.

June gets inebriated and a stumble results in her accidental death. Bill, however, is charged with her murder. Ann offers to defend him in court, but Bill can't bear that thought. When the case goes badly against him, however, Ann volunteers information that results in Bill's acquittal and their reconciliation.

Cast
 Lanny Ross as William Hayward
 Gloria Stuart as Ann Adams Hayward
 Joan Marsh as June Lane 
 Roy Benson as George Martin
 Pierre Watkin as Mr. Harper 
 Robert Paige as Ken Harper 
 Arthur Loft as Charles Clarke 
 Stanley Andrews as Baker
 Jane Buckingham as Mrs. Harper (Jan Buckingham)
 Bess Flowers as Miriam Harper 
 Ann Doran as Miss Hollins
 Vesey O'Davoren as Langham

References

External links
 
 
 
 

1938 films
1938 drama films
American drama films
American black-and-white films
Films directed by Erle C. Kenton
Columbia Pictures films
Films scored by Morris Stoloff
Films produced by William Perlberg
1930s English-language films
1930s American films